Siripuram Monagadu is an Indian Telugu-language action film released on 1 June 1983 starring Krishna in triple roles of Sridhar, Anand and Lion alongside Jaya Prada, K. R. Vijaya, Kaikala Satyanarayana, Nutan Prasad and Kantha Rao in the lead roles. The film was produced by Srikanth Nahata for Srikanth Pictures.

The film with its soundtrack album scored and composed by Chellapilla Satyam had its cinematography and editing handled by S. V. Srikanth and D. Venkataratnam respectively. M. S. Chakravarthy wrote the story while Paruchuri Brothers penned the dialogues. The film was recorded as a Superhit at the box office.

Cast

Lead Cast 
 Krishna as Sridhar, Ananad and Lion (Triple Role)
 Jaya Prada
 K. R. Vijaya
 Kaikala Satyanarayana
 Nutan Prasad
 Kantha Rao

Supporting Cast 
 Suttivelu
 Sutti Veerabhadra Rao
 Tyagaraju
 Vallam Narasimha Rao
 Kashinath Tata
 Bheemeswara Rao
 Ch. Krishna Murthy
 Mamatha
 Kalpana Rai
 Dubbing Janaki
 Varalakshmi
 Baby Meena
 Jayamalini

Music 
Chellapilla Satyam scored and composed the film's soundtrack album comprising 6 tracks with Veturi Sundararama Murthy penning the lyrics.
 "Madhuvu Maguvo" — P. Susheela
 "Kongu Patteyana" — S. P. B.
 "Cheetiki Maatiki" — S. P. B., P. Susheela
 "Veyi Chukka" — S. Janaki
 "Kuvakuva Kuvakuva" — P. Susheela, S. P. B.
 "Ammammo Buchade" — P. Susheela

References

External links 

Siripuram Monagadu on Twitter

1983 films
1983 action films
Indian action films
Films directed by K. S. R. Das
Films scored by Satyam (composer)